Alfred Jentoft Maurstad (26 July 1896 – 5 September 1967) was a Norwegian actor, movie director and theatre manager.

Biography
Alfred Jentoft Maurstad was born at Bryggja in Davik (now Vågsøy) in Sogn og Fjordane, Norway. He was the son of Brynnel Maurstad (1859–1943) and Lovise Marie Brølos (1867–1943).  Maurstad attended  a military academy in Bergen (Bergenske Brigades Underoffiserskole). 
During his teenage years he performed in several concerts in the district of Nordfjord, playing on his Hardanger fiddle. He moved to Kristiania and debuted in 1921 at Det Norske Teatret. He  began working at the Nationaltheatret in 1930. He was the theatre manager at Trøndelag Theater from 1945 to 1950. Maurstad played main parts in several films including  Fant (1937), Gjest Baardsen (1939), Tørres Snørtevold  (1940)  and   Trysil-Knut  (1942).

 He was a member of the Norwegian Association for Women's Rights.

Personal life
He was married twice; first in 1925 to Tordis Elfrida Witzøe (they divorced in 1943) and second in 1956 to Gro Scott-Ruud. His daughter Mari Maurstad (born 1957)  and son Toralv Maurstad (born 1926) are both actors. He was also the father-in-law of actress Beate Eriksen, his son's third wife.

Filmography
Actor
1926 – Brudeferden i Hardanger
1932 – Fantegutten
1934 – Liv
1935 – Samhold må til
1937 – Fant
1938 – Vingar kring fyren 
1939 – Gjest Baardsen
1940 – Bastard
1940 – Tørres Snørtevold
1941 – Hansen og Hansen
1942 – Trysil-Knut
1948 – Jørund Smed
1951 – Ørnedalen (Valley of the Eagles)
1951 – Ukjent mann
1958 – Laila 
1958 – Ut av mørket
1960 – Det store varpet

Director
1941 – Hansen og Hansen
1942 – En herre med bart

Screenwriter
1935 – Samhold må til
1941 – Hansen og Hansen

Musician
1939 – Gjest Baardsen

References

External links

1896 births
1967 deaths
People from Vågsøy
Norwegian male stage actors
Norwegian male film actors
Norwegian film directors
Norwegian screenwriters
Norwegian Association for Women's Rights people
20th-century screenwriters